Benoît Benoni-Auran (1859 in Monteux - 1944) was a Provençal master painter.

Works
Some of his works are displayed in the Town Hall of Monteux.

19th-century French painters
French male painters
20th-century French painters
20th-century French male artists
1859 births
1944 deaths
19th-century French male artists